Bentley is an English surname. Notable people with the surname include:

A–I
Arthur F. Bentley (1870–1957), American political scientist
Alex Bentley (born 1990), Belarusian basketballer
Alondra Bentley (born 1983), Spanish singer-songwriter
Andrew Bentley (born 1985), French rugby player
Beverly Bentley (1930–2018), American actress
Bev Bentley (born 1927), Canadian ice hockey player
Bill Bentley (footballer) (born 1947), English footballer
Bill Bentley (record producer) (born 1950), American record company executive and record producer
Bobby Bentley (active since 1986), American football coach
Charles Bentley (painter) (1806–1854), English painter
Christine Bentley (active since 1977), Canadian television journalist
Cy Bentley (1850–1873), Major League Baseball pitcher
Daniel Bentley (disambiguation)
Dan Bentley, British Paralympic boccia player
Daniel Bentley (born 1993), English footballer
Daniel S. Bentley (1850–1916), American minister, writer, newspaper founder
David Bentley (born 1984), English footballer
Denzel Bentley (born 1995), English professional boxer
Derek Bentley (1933–1953), English subject of a controversial court case
Dierks Bentley (born 1975), American country music singer
Doug Bentley (1916–1972), Canadian ice hockey player
Edmund Clerihew Bentley (1875–1956), British author and humorist
Elizabeth Bentley (writer) (1767–1839), British poet 
Elizabeth Bentley (1908–1963), American spy for the Soviet Union
Eric Bentley (1916–2020), critic, playwright, singer, editor and translator
Fonzworth Bentley (born 1974), American entertainer and designer, former assistant to Diddy
Geoffrey Bryan Bentley (1909–1996), English priest
Gladys Bentley (1907–1960), American blues singer
Greg Bentley (born 1987), Australian football player
Handel Bentley (1871–1945), English footballer
Helen Delich Bentley (1923–2016), American politician
Irene Bentley (1870–1940), American actress

J–Z
Jack Bentley (disambiguation), various people
Jake Bentley (born 1997), American football player
Jason Bentley (born 1970), American DJ
Ja'Whaun Bentley (born 1996), American football player
Jay Bentley (born 1964), American bassist for Bad Religion
John Bentley (disambiguation), various people
Jon Bentley (computer scientist) (born 1953), American computer scientist
Jon Bentley (TV presenter) (born 1961), English television presenter
Kane Bentley (born 1987), French rugby player
Ken Bentley (active since 2008), British director
Kenneth W. Bentley, chemist for whom were named the Bentley compounds
Kirsty Bentley (1983–1998), New Zealand murder victim
LeCharles Bentley (born 1979), American football player
Lester W. Bentley (1908–1972), American artist from Wisconsin
Marcus Bentley (born 1967), British actor, broadcaster and voice-over artist
Mark Bentley (born 1978), English football player/manager
Matt Bentley (born 1979), professional wrestler
Max Bentley (1920–1984), Canadian ice hockey player
Naomi Bentley (born 1981), British actress
Nicolas Bentley (1907–1978), British author and illustrator
Percy Bentley (1906–1982), Australian football player
Phyllis Bentley (1894–1977), English novelist
Richard Bentley (1662–1742), English classical scholar
Richard Bentley (publisher) (1794–1871), English printer and publisher of Bentley's Miscellany
Robert Bentley (disambiguation), various people
Roy Bentley (1924–2018), English footballer
Samantha Bentley (born 1987), English pornographic actress
Thomas Bentley (1884–1966), English film director
Thomas Bentley (manufacturer) (1731–1780), English businessmen
Tom Bentley, British political advisor
Toni Bentley (born 1958), Australian-American dancer and writer
Tony Bentley (born 1939), English footballer
Walter Bentley (actor) (1849–1927), Australian actor
Wes Bentley (born 1978), American actor
Wilson Bentley (1865–1931), American photographer of snowflakes
W. O. Bentley (1888–1971), British engineer, founder of Bentley Motors

Fictional characters
 Bernard Bentley, from Bob the Builder
Harry Bentley (The Jeffersons), from The Jeffersons
Jim Bently, from short stories by Henry Lawson

See also
Bently (disambiguation)#People

English-language surnames